The Roman Catholic Diocese of Buga is a diocese located in the city of Buga in the Ecclesiastical province of Cali in Colombia.

History
29 June 1966: Established as Diocese of Buga from the Metropolitan Archdiocese of Cali and Diocese of Palmira

Special churches
Minor Basilicas:
Basílica del Señor de los Milagros de Buga

Ordinaries
Julián Mendoza Guerrero (1967.01.03 – 1984.08.04)
Rodrigo Arango Velásquez, P.S.S. (1985.01.17 – 2001.01.19)
Hernán Giraldo Jaramillo (2001.01.19 – 2012.05.10)
Jose Roberto Ospina Leongomez (2012.05.10 – present)

See also
Roman Catholicism in Colombia

Sources

External links
Catholic Hierarchy
GCatholic.org

Roman Catholic dioceses in Colombia
Roman Catholic Ecclesiastical Province of Cali
Christian organizations established in 1966
Roman Catholic dioceses and prelatures established in the 20th century